Raymond Hull (1919–1985) was a Canadian playwright, television screenwriter, and lecturer. He also wrote many non-fiction books, numerous magazine articles, short stories, and poetry. He is best known as the co-author of the book The Peter Principle with Laurence J. Peter. He is also known for the saying "He who trims himself to suit everyone will soon whittle himself away."

He studied creative writing at the University of British Columbia at the age 30 after discovering he had an aptitude for the craft. After graduation, he eventually began writing television screenplays for the Canadian Broadcasting Corporation. He later branched into writing for the stage and in time formed The Gastown Players.

Works

Plays
The Drunkard (1967)
Wedded to a Villain (1967)
Son of the Drunkard (a.k.a. The Drunkard's Revenge, 1982)

Books
Profitable Playwriting (1968)
How To Get What You Want (1969)
Writing for Money in Canada (1969)
Effective Public Speaking (1971)
The Peter Principle (co-author)
Gastown's Gassy Jack (co-author)

1919 births
1985 deaths
20th-century Canadian dramatists and playwrights
Canadian non-fiction writers
Canadian male dramatists and playwrights
20th-century Canadian male writers
Canadian male non-fiction writers
20th-century Canadian screenwriters
20th-century Canadian non-fiction writers